Kalyana Vaibhogam is a 1997 Indian Tamil-language drama film directed by N. Rathnam, who had previously directed the film Chellakannu (1995). The film stars Ramki, Khushbu and Sangita, with Vadivelu, R. Sundarrajan, V. K. Ramasamy, Vennira Aadai Moorthy, Vijay Krishnaraj and Haja Shareef playing supporting roles. It was released on 5 September 1997. The film was a remake of Hindi film Aaina (1993).

Plot

Ramya and Shanthi are step-sisters. Ramya is arrogant while Shanthi is soft-spoken and sensitive. Sakthi is a writer and becomes popular by writing short stories in Tamil weekly magazines. Shanthi is Sakthi's avid fan and sends him letters every week anonymously, she is in love with him. Sakthi really likes her letters, Sakthi decides to meet her and he is eager to confess his love.

Sakthi thinks that the anonymous fan is Ramya. Later, Sakthi and Ramya fall in love with each other. By luck, Ramya becomes a model, and thereafter her popularity grows rapidly. Sakthi and Ramya decide to get married whereas the heartbroken Shanthi remained silent. The day of the wedding, Ramya runs away with dreams of being a cinema actress and Ramya asks him to wait for him. Feeling betrayed, Sakthi cannot accept it and he finally marries Shanthi. They live happily until Ramya comes back. What transpires later forms the crux of the story.

Cast

Ramki as Sakthi
Khushbu as Ramya
Sangita as Shanthi
Vadivelu as Jacky
R. Sundarrajan as Ganesan
V. K. Ramasamy as Shanthi's grandfather
Vennira Aadai Moorthy as Ramu
Vijay Krishnaraj as Rajasekhar
Haja Shareef
Thiagarajan
Kavitha as Kavitha
Baby Srividya
Baby Sowmya
Baby Sridevi

Soundtrack

The film score and the soundtrack were composed by Deva. The soundtrack, released in 1997, features 4 tracks with lyrics written by Pulamaipithan, Pazhani Bharathi, 'Nellai' Arulmani, Ravi Bharathi and Navendan.

References

1997 films
1990s Tamil-language films
Tamil remakes of Hindi films
Indian drama films
Films scored by Deva (composer)
1997 drama films